Digital Satellite Television, commonly abbreviated to DStv, is a Sub-Saharan African direct broadcast satellite service owned by MultiChoice and based in Randburg, South Africa. Launched on 6 October 1995, the service provides multiple audio, radio and television channels and services to subscribers, mostly in South Africa , Nigeria and Zimbabwe. DStv formerly had operations in Thailand under United Broadcasting Corporation (UBC), which is now TrueVisions.

History
In 1986, pay-television came to South Africa when a single-channel analogue service, M-Net, was launched by Naspers and local businesses/companies. For almost seven years, all of M-Net's operations were handled by a single dedicated company until 1995 when a second subsidiary company, MultiChoice, was launched. This company would take over the operations of M-Net including decoder sales, subscriber services (which were also available in local shops) and account management. MultiChoice would also embark on establishing presence in multiple countries outside South Africa which was effective to this day.

Not long after, a digital satellite service in South Africa was announced by MultiChoice and was launched that same year on 6 October 1995 as DStv, an abbreviation for Digital Satellite Television. On its launch, the debut television channels included M-Net, MGM, TNT, Sci-Fi Universal, SuperSport, ESPN, Cartoon Network, BBC World News, CNN International and Sky News. Over the 2 decades since then till today, television channels launch on the platform  when channel carriage contracts are signed and/or renewed between MultiChoice and another media conglomerate/broadcaster and ceases transmission when channel carriage contracts are not renewed.

This was followed by the launch of new services including: W4 Eutelsat satellite with Ku-band services to Sub-Saharan Africa and the Indian Ocean Islands in 2000, Interactive Television in 2002, the Dual-view decoder in 2003, and the DStv PVR decoder and the DStv Compact subscription package bundle in 2005.

The year 2008 saw the introduction of the HD PVR decoder, the XtraView decoder and the high definition feed of the M-Net channel.

In 2010, DVB over IP (Digital Video Broadcast over Internet Protocol) and DStv Catchup services were launched, as well as the HD PVR 2P decoder same year and M-Net Movies 1 got simulcast in high definition for the first time. DStv BoxOffice (a film/movie rental/on-demand service) and DStv Mobile were launched in 2011. Since 2012, DStv has also been re-broadcast on Saint Helena, but with only 30 selected channels.

As of 2022, Canal+ retains a 20.1% stake on DStv.

Channels and bouquets

DStv airs more than 200 television channels and radio stations. The list of channels differ and vary across the regions of Sub-Saharan Africa. There are five or six bouquets/packages, each with a different price range, and four add-on packages for premium film and series channels, Indian, Portuguese, French channels. Most current-day DStv decoders also offer access to MultiChoice's streaming platform, Showmax, along with other third-party apps through broadband connection and/or Wi-Fi connection.

Reception equipment
DStv has their set-top boxes manufactured by domestic company, Altech UEC, along with Arris International (for South Africa only) and Chinese electronics company, Skyworth, for the rest of the continent. The choice of boxes include a standard box with "XtraView" capabilities, an older personal video recorder, and the then-newest PVR box known as the Explora. An additional decoder known as the currently-discontinued Drifta allows the conversion of a DStv DVB-H signal to another digital device such as a laptop, tablet or smartphone for portable in-home viewing.

DStv App
DStv also offers a mobile app for mobile phone and tablet devices, along with PC to control DVRs and parental controls and allow access to recorded content and video on demand services. The app was previously known as DStv Mobile until 2016 and DStv Now until 2020.

Controversies

Price fixing 
In May 2017, DStv admitted to price fixing and contravening the Competition Act and agreed to pay R22 million in penalty fees as well as R8 million to the Economic Development Fund of South Africa.

References

External links

Television in Nigeria
Television in South Africa
Television in Ghana
Direct broadcast satellite services
Television channels and stations established in 1995
Mass media companies established in 1995